This list of tallest buildings and structures in Norwich ranks skyscrapers and other structures by height in Norwich, United Kingdom that are at least 35 metres tall.

{| class="wikitable sortable"
|-
! Rank
! Name
! Use
! Image
! Height (m)
! Floors
! Year
! Notes
|-
| 1
| Norwich Cathedral
| Religious
| 
| 96
| N/A
| 1145
|
|-
| 2
| Norwich City Hall
| Government
| 
| 63
| N/A
| 1938
|
|-
| 3=
| Normandie Tower
| Residential
| 
| 48
| 16
| 1966
|
|-
| 3=
| Winchester Tower
| Residential
| 
| 48
| 16
| 1966
|
|-
|5
| The Quad(Pablo Fanque House)
|Residential
| 
|46.2
|14
|2018
|
|-
| 6=
| County Hall
| Government
| 
| 45
| 13
| 1968
|
|-
| 6=
| Norfolk Tower
| Office
| 
| 45
| 11
| 1974
| 
|-
| 8
| St Peter Mancroft
| Religious
| 
| 44.5
| N/A
| 1455
|
|-
| 9
| University of East Anglia chimneys (x2)
| Industrial
| 
| 43
| N/A
| 1965
|
|-
| 10
| Westlegate Tower
| Residential
| 
| 41
| 13
| 2014
|  
|-
| 11
| St John the Baptist Cathedral, Norwich
| Religious
| 
| 38
| N/A
| 1910
|
|-
| 12=
| Compass tower
| Residential
| 
| 37
| 11
| 1964
|
|-
| 12=
| Ashbourne Tower
| Residential
| 
| 37
| 11
| 1964
|
|-
| 12=
| Burleigh Tower
| Residential
| 
| 37
| 11
| 1964
|
|-
| 15
| Aviva office buildings
| Office
| 
| 36.3
| 11
| ≈1970
|
|}

Tallest under construction, approved and proposed

Under construction

Approved

Proposed

See also
Buildings and architecture of Norwich

References

External links 

Lists of tallest buildings in the United Kingdom
Buildings and structures in Norwich
Tallest buildings
Tallest